Otamatea is a residential suburb of Whanganui, New Zealand. Otamatea is under the local governance of the Whanganui District Council.

Demographics

There were 687 households. There were 837 males and 897 females, giving a sex ratio of 0.93 males per female. The median age was 55.6 years (compared with 37.4 years nationally), with 225 people (13.0%) aged under 15 years, 192 (11.1%) aged 15 to 29, 678 (39.2%) aged 30 to 64, and 639 (36.9%) aged 65 or older.

Ethnicities were 89.3% European/Pākehā, 7.1% Māori, 0.9% Pacific peoples, 7.1% Asian, and 1.7% other ethnicities (totals add to more than 100% since people could identify with multiple ethnicities).

The proportion of people born overseas was 18.7%, compared with 27.1% nationally.

Although some people objected to giving their religion, 38.0% had no religion, 50.3% were Christian, 2.1% were Hindu, 1.4% were Muslim, 0.5% were Buddhist and 1.0% had other religions.

Of those at least 15 years old, 315 (20.9%) people had a bachelor or higher degree, and 276 (18.3%) people had no formal qualifications. The median income was $29,900, compared with $31,800 nationally. The employment status of those at least 15 was that 567 (37.6%) people were employed full-time, 210 (13.9%) were part-time, and 36 (2.4%) were unemployed.

References 

Suburbs of Whanganui